The 2003 UCI Mountain Bike & Trials World Championships were held in Lugano, Switzerland from 31 August to 7 September 2003. The disciplines included were cross-country, cross-country marathon, downhill, four-cross, and trials. The event was the 14th edition of the UCI Mountain Bike World Championships and the 18th edition of the UCI Trials World Championships.

This was the first year that the cross-country marathon was included in the UCI Mountain Bike & Trials World Championships. From 2004 onwards, the cross-country marathon was run as a separate world championship.

Anne-Caroline Chausson of France won her eighth consecutive world title in the women's downhill. As of 2016, no other rider has won more than two consecutive world titles in the event.

Greg Minnaar of South Africa won the world title in the men's downhill. He thus became the first rider from the continent of Africa to win a mountain biking world championship in an elite category.

Medal summary

Men's events

Women's events

Team events

Medal table

See also
2003 UCI Mountain Bike World Cup
UCI Mountain Bike Marathon World Championships

References

External links
 Results for the mountain-bike events on cyclingnews.com

UCI Mountain Bike World Championships
International cycle races hosted by Switzerland
UCI Mountain Bike and Trials World Championships
Mountain biking events in Switzerland